Marat Turdybekuly Ospanov (Marat Tūrdybekūly Ospanov) (17 September 1949 – 23 January 2000) was a Kazakh politician, 1st Chairman of Mazhilis from 1996 to 1999, member of the Supreme Council from 1990 to 1993, Deputy Chairman of the Supreme Council from 1994 to 1995, and a Deputy Minister of Finance from 1992 to 1994.
He was an author of an economic program “From Stabilization to Us”. Took part in the development of the first Tax Code of Kazakhstan, and in the Declaration of Independence of Kazakhstan. Ospanov was awarded the Order "Barys" II degree. He died on 23 January 2000 in Almaty.

References

1949 births
2000 deaths
Chairmen of the Mazhilis
Members of the Mazhilis